Tony Mestrov is an Australian former professional rugby league footballer who played as a  and  forward in the 1990s and 2000s. He played for the Manly-Warringah Sea Eagles and the South Sydney Rabbitohs in Australia, and for the London Broncos and the Wigan Warriors in the European Super League. Mestrov was the Chief Executive Officer of Greyhound Racing New South Wales from October 2017 till July 2022. 

Tony Mestrov return as the Chief Executive Officer of Manly-Warringah Sea Eagles in August 2022.

Playing career
Mestrov made his first-grade debut for Manly-Warringah in Round 12, 1990 against the Gold Coast Seagulls, coming off the bench in a 34–0 victory at Brookvale Oval.

In 1994, Mestrov signed for South Sydney.  Mestrov was a part of the Souths team which won that year's pre-season Tooheys Challenge Cup. Mestrov played in the final in which they defeated the Brisbane Broncos 27–26 at Albury.

Mestrov played one further season for Souths before departing at the end of 1995 to move to England and take up a contract with the London Broncos. He later signed with Wigan after leaving London at the end of 1997.

Mestrov played for Wigan as a prop forward in their 1998 Super League Grand Final victory over the Leeds Rhinos, and as an interchange forward in their 2000 Super League Grand Final loss to St Helens.

In 2001, Mestrov returned to the London Broncos for one final season before retiring from the game. He has a daughter named Isabella Mestrov.

References

External links
London Broncos profile
 Whiticker, Alan & Hudson, Glen (2006) The Encyclopedia of Rugby League Players, Gavin Allen Publishing, Sydney

1970 births
Australian people of Croatian descent
Australian expatriate sportspeople in England
Australian rugby league players
Wigan Warriors players
Manly Warringah Sea Eagles players
South Sydney Rabbitohs players
London Broncos players
Living people
Rugby league players from Sydney